Steven Alton Meeks (born September 10, 1974) is an American politician from Georgia. Meeks is a Republican member of Georgia House of Representatives for District 178.

References

Republican Party members of the Georgia House of Representatives
21st-century American politicians
Living people
1974 births